Cariboo-Chilcotin is a provincial electoral district in British Columbia, Canada. It was established by the Electoral Districts Act, 2008 and was first contested in the 2009 general election. It was last contested in the 2020 provincial election.

Geography
As of the 2020 provincial election, Cariboo-Chilcotin comprises the southern portion of the Cariboo Regional District. It is located in central British Columbia. Communities in the electoral district consist of Williams Lake and 100 Mile House.

History

Electoral history

References

British Columbia provincial electoral districts